Goosefoot or goose foot may refer to:

 The foot of a goose
 Chenopodium, the genus of plants known as goosefoots
 Chenopodiaceae, a defunct family of flowering plants now a part of Amaranthaceae
 Pes anserinus, meaning "goose foot", a tendinous structure in the human leg
 The parotid plexus, also known as pes anserinus.

Other species 
Other species with "goosefoot" in their common name include:
 Aristolochia rotunda, the Mercury goosefoot
 Scrobipalpa atriplicella, the goosefoot groundling moth
 Viola purpurea, the goosefoot violet
 Viola pinetorum, the goosefoot yellow violet
 Eupithecia sinuosaria, the goosefoot pug
 Acer pensylvanicum, also known as goosefoot maple
 Syngonium podophyllum, also known as goosefoot

See also 
 Bird's foot (disambiguation)
 Chicken claw (disambiguation)
 Chicken foot (disambiguation)
 Crow foot (disambiguation)
 Eagle claw (disambiguation)
 Goose step (disambiguation)
 Pes anserinus (disambiguation)